Junker may refer to:
Junker, originally a noble honorific used across the German-speaking realm and in today's Belgium and The Netherlands
Junker (Prussia), a 19th and early 20th century term for the landed aristocracy of Prussia and Eastern Germany
Junker (Russia),  derived from the German term, has several meanings in Russian
Junker (SS rank), a Waffen-SS officer candidate position 
Junker (grape), another name for the wine grape Chasselas
Bengt Junker, Swedish scouting leader
Hermann Junker, German Egyptologist
A decrepit car
JUNKER, a police task force in the video game Snatcher

Junkers may refer to:
Hugo Junkers, 1859–1935, famous German engineer
Junkers, a company founded by Hugo Junkers, chiefly known for its later role in aircraft design and construction.
Junkers-Chronographs
Junkers, a faction in the video game Freelancer
Junkers, brandname for boilers made by Robert Bosch GmbH

See also
Juncker
Jean-Claude Juncker, a politician from Luxembourg, President of the European Commission.

Surnames from nicknames